may refer to:

Seki-juku (Tōkaidō), a station on the Tōkaidō road in former Ise Province, Japan
Seki-shuku (Mikuni Kaidō), a station on the ancient Japanese highway Mikuni Kaidō
Seikijuku, a right-wing Japanese imperialist group